Tumbalong Park is a park in Darling Harbour, Sydney, Australia. The park was designed using native Australian foliage decorated with fountains as an urban stream. The name "Tumbalong" is from Dharug as spoken by the Eora people and means "place where seafood is found".

The park is used as a venue for central Sydney events, including New Year's Eve and Australia Day celebrations.

Culture 
This site was used for the skydiving opening scene in 20th Century Fox's Mighty Morphin Power Rangers: The Movie.

It used to be the location for Sega World Sydney which opened in 1997 and closed in November 2000.

Geography 
Tumbalong park spans .

A children's playground area includes a water park containing 26 water jets, a water slide, jumbo swings, tangled web and a 10 metre high octanet jungle gym.

The park is adjacent to the Chinese Garden of Friendship.

Amenities 
Public toilets, cafes and restaurants are located on the park's fringes.

Access 
The park is a free public space.

The closest train station is Town Hall.

Buses traverse Market, Park, Druitt, Bathurst or Liverpool Streets.

A ferry visits Darling Harbour, docking at King Street Wharf or Pyrmont Bay Wharf.

Light rail services Paddy's Market.

Car parks are nearby.

Incidents

In 1994, local David Kang fired two blank shots at Charles III (the then Prince of Wales) who was giving a speech at the park. Charles was not injured and Kang was arrested by police.

References

Geography of Sydney
Sydney localities
Tourist attractions in Sydney
Darling Harbour